Alpha Oumar Sow (born 12 February 1984) is a Senegalese former professional footballer who played as a forward. He made two appearances for the Senegal national team; one in 2009, and another in 2013.

Honours 
ASC Jaraaf

 Senegal FA Cup: 2013

References

External links 

 
 

1984 births
Living people
Footballers from Dakar
Senegalese footballers
Association football forwards

Casa Sports players
USC Corte players
US Sénart-Moissy players
Entente SSG players
ASC Jaraaf players
KAC Kénitra players
Union Aït Melloul players
Taunton Town F.C. players
Senegal Premier League players
Championnat National 3 players
Championnat National 2 players
Botola players
Senegal international footballers
Senegalese expatriate footballers
Expatriate footballers in France
Expatriate footballers in Morocco
Expatriate footballers in England
Senegalese expatriate sportspeople in France
Senegalese expatriate sportspeople in Morocco
Senegalese expatriate sportspeople in England
Senegal A' international footballers
2009 African Nations Championship players